José Antonio de Lavalle y Arias de Saavedra (22 March 1833 – 16 November 1893) was a Peruvian diplomat, writer and historian. He was Minister Plenipotentiary to Germany, Russia, Chile and Brazil and minister of Foreign Relations. He is known for having led the Peruvian Mission to Chile before the War of the Pacific and for signing Treaty of Ancón.

In the Congress, he was member of the Chamber of Deputies (1860 -1864) and the Senate (1874, 1876 – 1878).

Biography
Lavalle was born at Lima into a prominent family. His father was the soldier and politician Juan Bautista de Lavalle y Zugasti, son of the 1st Count of Premio Real and he himself Count of San Antonio de Vista Alegre, who decided to remain in Peru after the War of Independence and was later Interim President of the Republic. His mother was the youngest daughter of the 1st Count of Casa Saavedra.

He was educated at Colegio Nuestra Señora de Guadalupe. After finishing his studies, Lavalle entered the Diplomatic Service in 1851. He was subsequently attaché to the Peruvian legations in Washington, D.C. (1851), Rome (1852) and Madrid (1853), before he was promoted to Second Secretary to the legation in Chile (1854). Then, he retired from the service and married Mariana Pardo y Lavalle, his cousin and a daughter of the writer Felipe Pardo.

In 1860, Lavalle was elected Deputy for Lima. In 1866, he and his family moved to Europe living in France, Spain, England, Belgium, The Netherlands, Switzerland and Germany. While he was settled in London, the Government appointed him Minister Plenipotentiary to Berlin and St Petersburg in 1873. In the Russian court, he also headed the delegation who represented the Peruvian claim against the Japanese Emperor for the María Luz impasse, which was finally decided by the Tsar in favor of the Japaneses.

Upon his return to Lima in 1874, Lavalle was elected Senator for Loreto. In 1876, he was appointed Minister Plenipotentiary to Berlin, where he remained until 1878 when returned to Peru. He was Chairman of the Diplomatic Committee of the Congress when the Chilean-Bolivian conflict broke out in 1879. This year, the Government appointed him Special Envoy to Santiago to mediate in the controversy. During his mission he was informed of a secret treaty signed between his country and Bolivia in 1873 and despite his efforts the war broke out between the three countries.

After finishing his mission in 1879, he was appointed Minister Plenipotentiary to Rio de Janeiro. Returned to Peru in 1881, Lavalle was first held prisoner during the Chilean occupation of Lima and then sent to Chile. He received the declaration of surrender signed by a part of the Peruvian staff and was required to negotiate the peace. Released in 1883, he returned to Peru and was appointed by an interim government Minister of Foreign Affairs, signing in this capacity the Treaty of Ancón.

Retired from public life, Lavalle dedicated himself to academic matters. He participated in several literary circles and was one of the founders of the Peruvian Academy of Language and its first director in 1887.

Family 
In 1854, he married his first cousin Mariana Pardo y Lavalle, daughter of the writer Felipe Pardo and sister of the politician Manuel Pardo, later President of Peru. The couple had nine children including José Antonio de Lavalle y Pardo (1858–1918), later Minister of Justice and General Prosecutor of the Supreme Court, and Hernando de Lavalle y Pardo, killed in the Battle of San Juan in 1881.

References

External links

Peruvian diplomats
Lavalle family
Pardo family